Karen Mack (born 9 October 1947) is a German athlete. She competed in the women's pentathlon at the 1972 Summer Olympics.

References

External links
 

1947 births
Living people
Athletes (track and field) at the 1972 Summer Olympics
German pentathletes
Olympic athletes of West Germany
People from Oberstdorf
Sportspeople from Swabia (Bavaria)